The B-class was a class of 12 trams built by James & Moore & Sons for the Prahran & Malvern Tramways Trust (PMTT). Numbered 21-24 and 84-91, the former four taking numbers vacated when O class trams were sold to the Hawthorn Tramways Trust in 1916.

All passed to the Melbourne & Metropolitan Tramways Board on 2 February 1920 when it took over the PMTT becoming the B-class retaining their running numbers. Four were sold for further use in 1931 on the Bendigo network.

References

Melbourne tram vehicles